"Secret Santa" is the thirteenth episode of the sixth season of the American comedy series The Office and the show's 113th episode overall. It was written by Mindy Kaling and directed by Randall Einhorn. The night the episode premiered, it was immediately followed by an episode of 30 Rock with the same title.

In this episode, the office throws a Christmas party, and Michael is upset when Jim allows Phyllis to be Santa, since he has always been the one to dress up. Meanwhile, Oscar develops a crush on a new warehouse worker, and Andy's secret Santa gift to Erin – the 12 Days of Christmas, featuring live birds – does not go as well as planned.

Synopsis
Michael Scott (Steve Carell) comes into the office as Santa and is outraged that Jim Halpert (John Krasinski) had already allowed Phyllis Vance (Phyllis Smith) to be Santa at the office Christmas party this year. Everyone seems to enjoy having Phyllis as Santa, but Michael continues to try to steal her thunder, prompting Jim to tell him to cease and desist. Michael then rearranges his costume into a Jesus outfit and starts heckling and interrupting Phyllis while she's giving out the Secret Santa gifts. When Jim stops Michael again, Michael calls CFO David Wallace (Andy Buckley) to complain. David asks not to be bothered as someone made an agreement to buy the company, which means that everyone else, including himself, will likely lose their jobs.

Michael calls a conference meeting to try to keep up everyone's spirits but reveals that the company is going out of business, which puts everyone into shock. When Jim asks for confirmation, Michael says that David told him that the company is being sold. Jim notes that being sold could be different from going out of business, so Michael calls back David with everyone listening. David clarifies that he meant that only he, CEO Alan Brand, and a few other executives at corporate would lose their jobs, but the branches would remain because they are the only successful aspect of the company. The office then cheers and goes back to the party, where everyone receives their Secret Santa gifts, and Michael apologizes to Phyllis for trying to overshadow her.

Oscar Martinez (Oscar Nuñez) has a secret crush on Matt (Sam Daly), one of the new warehouse workers. Pam Halpert (Jenna Fischer) tries to play matchmaker and introduces Matt to Oscar. After conversing a while, Matt leaves, and Oscar asks Pam to let him pursue Matt by himself. Meanwhile, Dwight Schrute (Rainn Wilson) explains that his present has been delivered to him in pieces over the course of several weeks.  After his first attempt to assemble it, he believes it is a gun. However, after a hint from Michael, he rebuilds it and realizes it is, in fact, a nutcracker, which pleases him. Additionally, Andy Bernard (Ed Helms) had asked to have Erin Hannon (Ellie Kemper) as his recipient for Secret Santa and decides to give her the Twelve Days of Christmas as his gift to her. Regardless, the gifts — most of which are actual live birds — are causing her physical harm, prompting her to publicly ask her Secret Santa to discontinue. Andy asks Phyllis not to reveal him as Erin's Secret Santa, but Michael reveals that Andy had Erin for Secret Santa, and she becomes upset with Andy. At the end of the episode, as the office leaves for the night, they are greeted by the "twelve drummers" in the parking lot. Andy joins them and wishes Erin a Merry Christmas, completing his Secret Santa gift to her. They start drumming and Erin is visibly pleased by the gesture.

Reception
This episode was watched by 8.51 million viewers, with a 4.2 rating and an 11 share in the 18–49 demographic. IGN's Dan Phillips gave the episode an 8.7/10 saying that "The episode had a lot of great lines; for example Jim eventually shows up with a great line of his own, telling Michael, "You can't yell out 'I need this, I need this!' as you pin down an employee on your lap" and also noting "there have been better, funnier Christmas episodes in the past, but not by all that much".

Producer's cut
Five days after the episode first aired on television, Hulu added the producer's cut of the episode to their website. This version includes 9 extra minutes, bringing the total length of the episode to 29:43.

References

External links
 "Secret Santa" at NBC.com
 

2009 American television episodes
The Office (American season 6) episodes
American Christmas television episodes
Television episodes written by Mindy Kaling